The Napasorsuaq is a 1,590m–high mountain in southern Greenland, in the Kujalleq municipality.

Geography
The mountain rises in the mountainous peninsula of the mainland which forms the eastern side of the Southern Sermilik fjord. It is the highest peak of a moderately glaciated mountain chain stretching in a SW/NE direction with summits reaching 1,400 m. The Kirkespirdalen Dal valley, named after the mountain, stretches westwards onto the Saqqa Fjord.

The Napasorsuaq is a popular mountain among climbers because of its firm granite walls, similar to other peaks in the region such as Ketil and Ulamertorsuaq.

See also
Big wall climbing
List of mountains in Greenland

References

External links
Karsten Secher, GEUS - The Nalunaq Gold Mine

Mountains of Greenland